Richard Martin Gilman (April 30, 1923 – October 28, 2006) was an American drama and literary critic.

Early life 
On April 30, 1923, Gilman was born as Richard Martin Gilman in Brooklyn, New York, U.S. Gilman's family is Jewish.

Education 
In 1947, Gilman graduated with a B.A. from the University of Wisconsin.

Career 
Gilman enlisted into the U.S. Marine Corps in 1941 and was stationed in the Pacific during World War II. After his service, he attended the New School for Social Research in New York.

Gilman was a freelance writer. After converting to Catholicism, he wrote for the left-leaning Catholic journal Commonweal and from 1964 to 1967, he was the drama critic for Newsweek.

In 1967, the dean of the Yale School of Drama, Robert Brustein, invited him to teach. Gilman was a professor at Yale School of Drama for 31 years. He also taught at Columbia, Stanford, Barnard and the City University of New York.

Gilman was the author of five books of criticism, and a memoir.

Personal life 
In 1949, Gilman married painter Esther Morgenstern. In 1966, Gilman married Lynn Nesbit, a literary agent, (who would go on to co-found the literary agency Janklow & Nesbit Associates with Morton L. Janklow), In 1992, Gilman married Japanese scholar, Yasuko Shiojiri, who would translate his books into Japanese. Gilman has three children from his first two marriages: Nicholas, Priscilla, and Claire.

Gilman died of lung cancer on October 28, 2006, at the age of 83 at his home in Kusatsu, Shiga Prefecture, Japan.

He was born Jewish, converted to Catholicism as an adult, and lapsed from that faith eight years later. His memoir Faith, Sex, Mystery is primarily devoted to explaining his conversion and deconversion.

References

External links
 New York Times obituary
 Los Angeles Times obituary

1923 births
2006 deaths
American literary critics
20th-century American Jews
American theater critics
Converts to Roman Catholicism from Judaism
Deaths from lung cancer in Japan
Yale School of Drama faculty
Former Roman Catholics
21st-century American Jews